Anna Propošina (born 28 November 1990) is a Latvian footballer who plays as a defender and has appeared for the Latvia women's national team.

Career
Propošina has been capped for the Latvia national team, appearing for the team during the 2019 FIFA Women's World Cup qualifying cycle.

References

External links
 
 
 

1990 births
Living people
Latvian women's footballers
Latvia women's international footballers
Women's association football defenders
FC Skonto/Cerība-46.vsk. players